K.T. Stevens (born Gloria Wood, July 20, 1919 – June 13, 1994) was an American film and television actress.

Early years
Stevens was born in Los Angeles, the daughter of film producer and director Sam Wood. She made her first film appearance when she was just two years old in her father's second silent film, Peck's Bad Boy (1921).

As an adult, she changed her name to K.T. Stevens to distance herself from her father's fame. She initially called herself Katherine Stevens, which people often shorted to Katie, leading to the final version with the initials K.T.

Stage
Stevens gained theatrical experience by doing summer stock theatre in Skowhegan, Maine. Her Broadway credits include The Land Is Bright, Yankee Point, Nine Girls and Laura.

Film
Stevens appeared in a number of films in the 1940s and 1950s, including Kitty Foyle  (1940, directed by her father) with Ginger Rogers, The Great Man's Lady (1942) with Barbara Stanwyck, Address Unknown (1944), Port of New York (1949) with Yul Brynner, Harriet Craig (1950) with Joan Crawford and Vice Squad (1953) with Edward G. Robinson. She also appeared as Phyllis in the 1969 hit movie Bob & Carol & Ted & Alice. Her last film role before her death from lung cancer was in the 1994 Whoopi Goldberg film Corrina, Corrina.

Television
Stevens acted on episodic television in such series as Crossroads, The Rebel, The Brothers Brannagan, and appeared on the daytime soap operas General Hospital as part of the original cast (1963–1965), portraying Peggy Mercer who was engaged to Dr. Steve Hardy, Julie Olson's mother-in-law Helen Martin (1966–1967, 1969) on Days of Our Lives and The Young and the Restless (1976–1981) as the veiled, facially burned Vanessa Prentiss. In the episode "New Neighbors" of the sitcom I Love Lucy, she played opposite Hayden Rorke as television actors who Lucy Ricardo mistakenly believes are foreign secret agents.

Stevens appeared in 1957 and again in 1961 in different roles on The Real McCoys. In 1959, she made her first of three guest appearances on Perry Mason as murder victim Ethel Garvin in "The Case of the Dubious Bridegroom." In 1962, she played Margit Bruner in "The Case of the Ancient Romeo," and in 1965, she played Alice Munford in "The Case of the Hasty Honeymooner." In this episode, she was featured as the wife of murderer Guy Munford, played by her then husband Hugh Marlowe. In 1961, she played Ada Kihlgren in "The Broken Wing", one of the latter episodes of Dick Powell's Zane Grey Theatre. The same year, she appeared as Lorraine Miller in "A Great Day for a Scoundrel" on The DuPont Show with June Allyson. Between 1960 and 1963, she guest-starred five times on The Rifleman. 

She portrayed Lieutenant Harriet Twain in the Buck Rogers in the 25th Century episode "Return of the Fighting 69th".

Personal life
In 1946, Stevens married actor Hugh Marlowe, with whom she had two sons, Jeffrey and Christian. Stevens and Marlowe acted in the Broadway production of Laura in which, credited as "A Girl" so as not to alert the audience, she played the title role (acted by Gene Tierney in the 1944 film Laura. The couple  divorced in 1968. 

Stevens died at her home in Brentwood, California on June 13, 1994, after battling lung cancer.

Filmography

References

External links

 
 
 

1919 births
1994 deaths
20th-century American actresses
American film actresses
American television actresses
Deaths from lung cancer in California
Actresses from Los Angeles